Stephen Robert Lowndes (born 17 June 1960) is a former Wales international footballer. Lowndes started his career at Newport County during the most successful period in the club's long history. Lowndes was part of the team that won promotion from the old Division 4 and the Welsh Cup and in the subsequent season reached the quarter-final of the 1981 European Cup Winners' Cup.

Millwall signed him from Newport County for £55,000 in August 1983 and he was sold to Barnsley in 1986 for £40,000.

Coaching
After retiring from playing he became physio to the Wales international team for five years. After gaining BA Hons Degree (1999) & P.G.C.E. in physical education (2000) in June 2000 was appointed Academy Director at Cirencester Football Academy and helped develop professional players such as James Constable, Matt Green, Chris Zebroski and Stuart Nelson. He has also led the academy to a number of honor's over the years. ESFA Under 18's Colleges' Trophy winners 2000, 2002, 2005, and 2012. The academy has consistently competed in the F.A. Youth Cup defeating a number of professional youth teams. He is a UEFA 'A' Licence Coach, a qualified Sports Therapist as well as holding a B.A. (Hons) Degree and P.G.C.E. Physical Education (qualified teacher status).

References

1960 births
Living people
Wales international footballers
Welsh footballers
Newport County A.F.C. players
Millwall F.C. players
Barnsley F.C. players
Hereford United F.C. players
Footballers from Newport, Wales
English Football League players
People from Caerleon
People educated at Caerleon Comprehensive School
Association football midfielders